Dan-Virgil Voiculescu (born 14 June 1949) is a Romanian professor of mathematics at the University of California, Berkeley. He has worked in single operator theory, operator K-theory and von Neumann algebras. More recently, he developed free probability theory.

Education and career
Voiculescu studied at the University of Bucharest, receiving his PhD in 1977 under the direction of Ciprian Foias. He was an assistant at the University of Bucharest (1972–1973), a researcher at the Institute of Mathematics of the Romanian Academy (1973–1975), and a researcher at INCREST (1975–1986). He came to Berkeley in 1986 for the International Congress of Mathematicians, and stayed on as visiting professor.  Voiculescu was appointed professor at Berkeley in 1987.

Awards and honors
He received the 2004 NAS Award in Mathematics from the National Academy of Sciences (NAS) for “the theory of free probability, in particular, using random matrices and a new concept of entropy to solve several hitherto intractable problems in von Neumann algebras.”

Voiculescu was elected to the National Academy of Sciences in 2006. In 2012 he became a fellow of the American Mathematical Society.

References

External links
Berkeley page
Notes on Free probability aspects of random matrices
Dan-Virgil Voiculescu: visionary operator algebraist and creator of free probability theory

Romanian emigrants to the United States
Members of the United States National Academy of Sciences
20th-century Romanian mathematicians
20th-century American mathematicians
21st-century American mathematicians
Mathematical analysts
Probability theorists
University of California, Berkeley faculty
Romanian academics
University of Bucharest alumni
Scientists from Bucharest
Fellows of the American Mathematical Society
Living people
1949 births
21st-century Romanian mathematicians